Maketang (Mandarin: 马克堂镇) is a town in Jainca County, Huangnan Tibetan Autonomous Prefecture, Qinghai, China. In 2010, Maketang had a total population of 19,226 people: 9,841 males and 9,385 females: 5,169 under 14 years old, 13,054 aged between 15 and 64 and 1,003 over 65 years old.

References 

Township-level divisions of Qinghai
Huangnan Tibetan Autonomous Prefecture